Cowan is a surname of both Scottish-Irish and Jewish origins.

As a Scottish or Irish surname
The name Cowan is first seen in the historical record in the UK and Ireland among Briton people in the Scottish and English borderlands. It derives from the old Gaelic MacEoghain or MacEoin (the "mac" prefix meaning "son of") or the Gaelic given name Eoghan. Alternate Anglicized spellings in Scotland include Cowen and Kewon. Similar names with the same derivation in Ireland and Northern Ireland are Coen, Coan, and Coyne, as well as McKeown and McKeon (the Irish prefix "mc" having the same meaning as the Scottish Gaelic "mac").

Notable people with the surname
 Adeline May Cowan, Scottish botanist
 Aileen H. Cowan (born 1926), Canadian painter and sculptor
 Andrew Cowan (disambiguation), several people
 Austin M. Cowan (1885–1949), Justice of the Kansas Supreme Court
 Barry Cowan (broadcaster), journalist and broadcaster
 Barry Cowan (tennis), former tennis player
 Bernard Cowan (1922–1990), Canadian actor, producer, and writer
 Cathy A. Cowan, American economist and social scientist
 Charles Cowan (1801–1889), Scottish politician and papermaker
 Charles Cowan (cricketer) (1883–1958), Welsh-born English cricketer and naval officer
 Charley Cowan (1938–1998), American football player 
 Cindy Cowan, Movie producer
 Clyde Cowan, co-discoverer of the neutrino
 Darcy Rivers Warren Cowan, Australian medical practitioner
 David Tennant Cowan, British World War II general known as "Punch" Cowan
 Denys Cowan, American comic book artist and television producer
 Ed Cowan (born 1982), Australian cricketer
 Edith Cowan, first female member of an Australian parliament
 Elliot Cowan, actor
 Ernest Cowan, Western Australian politician
 Glenn Cowan, American table tennis player, involved in Ping Pong Diplomacy
 Harry Cowan (1893–1974), Scottish footballer 
 Hendy Cowan (born 1943), Western Australian politician
 Henry Cowan, British politician
 Henry Kenneth Cowan, a British medical practitioner
 Hugh Cowan, a former Canadian church minister, historian, author and editor
 James Alexander Cowan, son of Hugh Cowan, was a Canadian writer and a well known public relations consultant
 James Cowan (author), Australian author
 James Cowan (British Army officer) Major General, British Army
 James Cowan (South Australian politician)
 Jean Hunter Cowan, Scottish artist
 Jeff Cowan, ice hockey player
 Jerome Cowan, actor
 Joe Cowan, American football player
 John Cowan, American soul music and progressive bluegrass vocalist and bass guitar player
 John Cowan (RAN officer), Australian navy officer
 John Cowan (sheriff), Lord Mayor of London
 John Cowan (South Australian politician)
 John Lancelot Cowan, South Australian politician
 John Macqueen Cowan (1892–1960), Scottish botanist
 John W. Cowan, American programmer involved with Unicode and Lojban
 Lee Cowan, American news correspondent.
 Lawrence Cowan (1858–1933), American politician, lawyer, and businessman
 Michael Cowan (1933–2022), English cricketer
 Michael L. Cowan (born 1944), Surgeon General of the United States Navy
 Nelson Cowan, American researcher in psychology, specialized in working memory
 Patrick Cowan, American football player
 Philip R. Cowan
 Ralph Wolfe Cowan (1931–2018), American artist
 Ralph Cowan (politician) (1902–1990), Canadian politician
 Ralph Cowan (cricketer) (born 1960), English cricketer
 Ralph Cowan (footballer), Scottish footballer
 Reed Cowan, American journalist
 Richard Cowan (bass-baritone) (1957–2015), American operatic bass-baritone
 Richard Cowan (cannabis activist), a leader of NORML and proponent of the decriminalization of marijuana
 Richard Cowan (soldier), posthumous recipient of the Medal of Honor
 Riki Cowan (born 1963), New Zealand rugby union player
 Robert Cowan (governor), Governor of Bombay from 1729 to 1734
 Samuel Cowan (born 1941), British general
 Samuel Cowan (historian) (1835–1914), Scottish historian
 Thomas Cowan (South Australian politician)
 Thomas F. Cowan, New Jersey State Senator and Assemblyman
 Tim Cowan, American football player
 Tom Cowan (born 1969), Scottish footballer
 Tom Cowan (filmmaker) (born 1942), Australian filmmaker
 Tommy Cowan (born 1946), Reggae producer and singer
 Walter Cowan (1871–1956), Royal Navy admiral who saw service in both WWI and WWII
 William "Mo" Cowan (born 1969), U.S. Senator from Massachusetts

See also
James Cowan (disambiguation)
John Cowan (disambiguation)
Thomas Cowan (disambiguation)
William Cowan (disambiguation)
 Cowen (surname)

References

Scottish surnames
Jewish surnames
English-language surnames